A general election was held in Minneapolis on November 7, 2017. Minneapolis's mayor was up for election as well as all the seats on the City Council, the two elected seats on the Board of Estimate and Taxation, and all the seats on the Park and Recreation Board. Voters were able to rank up to three candidates for each office in order of preference.

Mayor 

Incumbent Minnesota Democratic–Farmer–Labor Party (DFL) Mayor Betsy Hodges sought re-election to a second term among a field of 16 candidates. Jacob Frey won after five rounds of vote tabulations via instant-runoff voting.

City Council 

All 13 seats on the Minneapolis City Council were up for election. 13 members were elected from single-member districts via instant-runoff voting.

Board of Estimate and Taxation 
The two elected seats on the Board of Estimate and Taxation were up for election. Two members were elected from one citywide, at-large district via the single transferable vote.

Candidates

Results

Park and Recreation Board 
All nine seats on the Park and Recreation Board were up for election. Three members were elected from one citywide, at-large district via the single transferable vote and six from single-member districts via instant-runoff voting.

Retiring members 
 John Erwin, At-large
 Jon Olson, District 2
 Anita Tabb, District 4
 Scott Vreeland, District 3
 Liz Wielinski, District 1
 Annie Young, At-large

Candidates

Results 
Incumbents Meg Forney (At-large), Steffanie Musich (District 5), and Brad Bourn (District 6) were re-elected. Also elected were at-large candidates LaTrisha Vetaw and Londel French, Chris Meyer (District 1), Kale Severson (District 2), Abdikadir "AK" Hassan (District 3), and Jono Cowgill (District 4).

At-large

District 1

District 2

District 3

District 4

District 5

District 6

Notes

References

External links 
 Minneapolis Elections & Voter Services

Minneapolis municipal
Minneapolis 2017
Minneapolis municipal